Alan Marshall (born 12 August 1938) is a British film producer.

In 1967, Marshall was working as a film editor at Signal Films (part of EUE/Screen Gems) in Berwick St London. He left to be a commercials producer at Collett, Dickenson & Pearce (CDP). In 1970, he and director Alan Parker established an advertising company, which brought the pair domestic and international awards. 

Before producing feature films, with help from CDP, Marshall and Parker started the TVC production company Alan Parker Productions. Marshall and Parker's first feature film, the 1976 musical Bugsy Malone, garnered critical success, achieving eight British Academy Award nominations. The pair followed their successful feature film debut with the 1978 neo-noir drama Midnight Express, written by Oliver Stone, with David Puttnam joining the producing team. The film was nominated for six Academy Awards, and took home Oscars for best screenplay and best original score. It was also nominated for the Cannes Film Festival's Palme d'Or. 

Marshall continued to make his mark as a film producer with critical films including Fame, Shoot the Moon, and Pink Floyd – The Wall. After the 1987 film Angel Heart, Marshall decided to leave working with Parker to focus on other feature films. Marshall has been the producer for other features such as Homeboy, Jacob's Ladder, Basic Instinct and Hollow Man.

Filmography
He was a producer in all films unless otherwise noted.

Film

Thanks

Television

Thanks

References

 https://web.archive.org/web/20110816184523/http://uk.movies.yahoo.com/artists/m/Alan-Marshall/index-138337.html

External links

1938 births
Living people
BAFTA Outstanding British Contribution to Cinema Award
Golden Globe Award-winning producers
Film producers from London